Coursetia brachyrachis is a species of legume in the family Fabaceae. It is found in Argentina and Bolivia. It is threatened by habitat loss.

References

Robinieae
Flora of Argentina
Flora of Bolivia
Vulnerable plants
Taxonomy articles created by Polbot